This is a list of individuals who were former or serving Members of Parliament for the House of Commons of the United Kingdom by decade of death.

List 

 List of United Kingdom MPs who died in the 1990s
 List of United Kingdom MPs who died in the 2000s
 List of United Kingdom MPs who died in the 2010s
 List of United Kingdom MPs who died in the 2020s

See also 

Death-related lists
Death
Lists of politics lists
MPs by decade of death
Lists of United Kingdom MPs by decade of death